Baynard Hardwick Kendrick (April 8, 1894 – March 22, 1977) was an American mystery novelist. He wrote whodunit novels about Duncan Maclain, a blind private investigator who worked with his two German shepherds and his household of assistants to solve murder mysteries. The novels were the basis for two films starring Edward Arnold, Eyes in the Night (1942) and The Hidden Eye (1945). Kendrick was credited by Stirling Silliphant for being the source of the Longstreet character about a blind insurance investigator. He also wrote using the pseudonym Richard Hayward.

Biography

Kendrick was born in Philadelphia and traveled to Canada as the first American citizen to enlist in the Canadian Army during World War I. He served in England, France, and Salonika. During his service, a fellow Philadelphian serving with the Canadians was blinded. When Kendrick visited him at St Dunstan's he met a blind English soldier who had a remarkable ability to tell him things about himself that a sighted person may not have noticed. The Tommy fingered Kendrick's buttons, uniform and insignia and accurately and rapidly stated Kendrick's war service record.

Following the war, Kendrick sold his first story to Field and Stream magazine while earning his living at Bin and Big's Hotels in New York. In 1931 he was let go from the company a week before Christmas and, vowing never again to work for an employer, began supporting himself by writing. After three books Kendrick started writing for pulp magazines, which paid well.

Kendrick's writing reflected two personal interests that he had developed: an interest in blind people and their coping skills and an interest in the history of Florida.

During World War II, Kendrick served as an instructor for blinded veterans giving him the material for his books 
"Bright Victory" and Lights Out. "Bright Victory" was turned into an excellent movie in 1951, starring Arthur Kennedy.

His novel Out of Control was adapted to an episode of the radio thriller series Suspense in 1946, featuring Brian Donlevy as Duncan Maclain.

The true story behind Kendrick's 1959 Hot Red Money was the basis for John Barron's Operation SOLO: The FBI's Man in the Kremlin.

Kendrick was one of the founders of the Mystery Writers of America, held its first membership card, and was its first president.

He died in 1977.

Duncan Maclain novels
Novels in the Duncan Maclain series:
The Last Express (1937). Filmed in 1938 for Universal.
The Whistling Hangman (1937)
Odor of Violets (1941) (aka Eyes in the Night). Filmed as Eyes in the Night in 1942. First published as a newspaper serial in the New York Daily News and others, 1941, as The Odor of Violets
Blind Man's Bluff (1943). First published as a newspaper serial in the New York Daily News and others, 1942
Death Knell (1945). First published as a newspaper serial in the New York Daily News and others, 1945, as Private Investigator Maclain (1945)
Out of Control (1945)
Make Mine Maclain (three novelets) (1947)
The Murderer Who Wanted More (Dell Ten-Cent edition, 1951, one of the three novelets from Make Mine Maclain, q.v.)
You Die Today (1952)
Blind Ally (1954). First published as a newspaper serial in 1954
Clear and Present Danger (1958). First published as a newspaper serial in 1958
Reservations for Death (1958). First published as a newspaper serial in 1956
The Aluminum Turtle (1960) (aka The Spear Gun Murders). First published as a newspaper serial in 1960
Frankincense and Murder (1961). First published as a newspaper serial in 1961

Miles Standish Rice novels
The Eleven of Diamonds (1936) New York: Greenburg. Serialised, Vancouver Sun (1937)
The Iron Spiders (1936) (aka The Iron Spiders Murder) New York: Greenburg.
Death Beyond the Go-Thru (1938) New York: Doubleday, Doran.

Non-series novels
Blood on Lake Louisa (1934) New York: Greenburg.
Flames of Time  (1948) New York: Charles Scribner's Sons.
The Tunnel (1949)
Trapped (1952) (under the pseudonym of Richard Hayward)
They Never Talk Back (1954). Novel by Henry Trefflich, "as told to Baynard Kendrick"
The Soft Arms of Death (1954) (under the pseudonym of Richard Hayward)
Hot Red Money (1959). First published as a newspaper serial in 1959
Flight from a Firing Wall (1966) New York: Simon & Schuster.
Lights Out (1945) New York: William Morrow. Filmed as Bright Victory (1951)

Other books
Orlando: A Century Plus (1976)

Short stories
The Hard Way. Chicago Tribune, 3 January 1943
The Murderer Who Wanted More. American Magazine, January 1944
Melody in Death. American Magazine, June 1945
The Perfect Murder (1947) (Maclain). Also published as The Case of the Perfect Murder Scheme
Minus Four Equals Murder (1954)
Hotel in the Hammock (1956)
The Cloth of Gold Murders. American Magazine, January 1956
Silent Night. Sleuth Mystery Magazine, December 1958; Murder For Christmas, 1982, Volume 2 
The Silent Whistle

Articles
 Florida's 'Most Vulnerable' Spot. Tampa Tribune, 5 February 1961
 Jose Met His Match. Tampa Tribune, 12 February 1961
 Those Bass Were Bigger in 1908!. Tampa Tribune, 19 February 1961
 No Whiskey in the White House!. Tampa Tribune, 26 February 1961
 Over the Mudholes in a Maxwell. Tampa Tribune, 5 March 1961
 The Near Death of a Salesman. Tampa Tribune, 12 March 1961 
 He Changed His Name to Yule. Tampa Tribune, 19 March 1961
 Blue-Nosed Reformer and His Sinful Paradise. Tampa Tribune, 26 March 1961
 WA Bowles - Florida's Uncrowned King. Tampa Tribune, 16 April 1961
 The Slave Trader with an African Wife. Tampa Tribune, 23 April 1961
 The Costly Seminole War over Stray Slaves. Tampa Tribune, 30 April 1961
 That Riotous Hunting Trip to Gulf Hammock. Tampa Tribune, 7 May 1961
 Daniel McGirth and His Horse Gray Goose. Tampa Tribune, 14 May 1961
 Florida Banks Crashed in Earlier Boom Too. Tampa Tribune, 21 May 1961
 When Sidney J Catts Went Republican. Tampa Tribune, 11 June 1961
 Bubbling Tourist Trade on the St John's River. Tampa Tribune, 18 June 1961
 'Wreck Ashore!' The Cry that Wrecked Key West. Tampa Tribune, 25 June 1961
 How Governor Duval Bearded an Indian Chief. Tampa Tribune, 2 July 1961
 A Black-Hearted Pair - Blackbeard and Caesar. Tampa Tribune, 17 September 1961
 Chactaws Took Good Care of Aged Ill. Tampa Tribune, 12 August 1962
 Patrick Speaks on 'Mobile Frontier'. Tampa Tribune, 6 January 1963
 An Election Day Threat Shot down in Ambush in the Wild and Wooley Days. Tampa Tribune, 3 November 1968

Further reading
John Barron (1996), Operation SOLO: The FBI's Man in the Kremlin'', Washington, Regnery.

External links
 
Eyes in the Night, public domain film at Internet Archive.
Baynard Hardwick Kendrick Collection 1894-1977 at the University of South Florida

References

1894 births
1977 deaths
American mystery novelists
20th-century American novelists
Edgar Award winners
American male novelists
20th-century American male writers